Rishav Das (born 16 December 1989) is an Indian first-class cricketer who plays for Assam in domestic cricket. He is a right-handed opening batter. Das made his first-class debut against Jammu and Kashmir at Jammu in the 2013–14 Ranji Trophy. He made his List A debut on 27 February 2014, for Assam in the 2013–14 Vijay Hazare Trophy.

References

External links
 
 

1989 births
Living people
Indian cricketers
Assam cricketers
Cricketers from Guwahati